The Polygalaceae or the milkwort family are made up of flowering plants in the order Fabales. They have a near-cosmopolitan range, with about 27 genera and ca. 900 known species of herbs, shrubs and trees. Over half of the species are in one genus, Polygala, the milkworts.

The family was first described in 1809 by Johann Hoffmansegg and Johann Link. In 1896, Robert Chodat split it into 3 tribes. A fourth tribe was split off from the tribe Polygaleae in 1992.  Under the Cronquist classification system, Polygalaceae were treated in a separate order of their own, Polygalales. Currently, according to the Angiosperm Phylogeny Group, the family belongs in Fabales.

Description
Polygalaceae are annual or perennial herbs, shrubs, shrublets, and small trees. Its zygomorphic, hermaphrodite, bisexual flowers have 3-5 petals and 5 sepals. Its leaves are usually alternate, but may be opposite, fascicled, or verticillate. Each flower usually contains 8 stamens, though this may range from 3 to 10. They are usually in 2 series. The fruits of each plant can be a capsule, samara, or drupe.

Tribes and genera
The Polygalaceae comprise the following genera, with tribes based on various sources.

Carpolobieae Eriksen
Atroxima Stapf
Carpolobia G. Don
Moutabeae Chodat
Barnhartia Gleason
Diclidanthera Mart.
Eriandra P. Royen & Steenis
Moutabea Aubl.
Polygaleae Chodat
Acanthocladus Klotzsch ex Hassk.
Asemeia Raf.
Badiera DC.
Bredemeyera Willd.
Caamembeca J.F.B. Pastore
Comesperma Labill.
Epirixanthes Blume
Gymnospora (Chodat) J.F.B. Pastore
Hebecarpa (Chodat) J.R. Abbott
Heterosamara Kuntze
Hualania Phil.
Monnina Ruiz & Pav.
Monrosia Grondona
Muraltia DC.
Phlebotaenia Griseb.
Polygala L.
Polygaloides Haller
Rhamphopetalum J.F.B.Pastore & M.Mota
Rhinotropis (S.F. Blake) J.R. Abbott
Salomonia Lour.
Securidaca L.
Xanthophylleae Chodat
Xanthophyllum Roxb.
Other genera
Trigoniastrum  Miq.

Fossils
†Deviacer Manchester
†Paleosecuridaca Pigg, Kathleen B., M.L. DeVore & M.F. Wojc. 2008

Systematics
Modern molecular phylogenetics suggest the following relationships:

References

 
Rosid families